James Fry may refer to:

 James Fry (writer) (born 1982), Australian writer
 James Fry (politician) (1880–1948), member of the Queensland Legislative Assembly
 James Barnet Fry (1827–1894), American soldier and author
 James C. Fry (1897–1982), United States Army general